is a railway station of West Japan Railway Company (JR-West) in Nara, Nara Prefecture, Japan. Although the station is on the Kansai Main Line as rail infrastructure, it is served by both the Nara Line and the Yamatoji Line in terms of passenger train services. It has the station numbers "JR-Q37" (Yamatoji Line) and "JR-D20" (Nara Line).

Layout
Narayama station has two side platforms with two tracks. A ticket machine is installed at the station. The IC card ticket "ICOCA" can be used at this station.

Platforms

Passenger statistics
According to the "Statistical Yearbook of Nara Prefecture", the average number of people riding in recent years is as follows.

See also
 List of railway stations in Japan

External links

  

Railway stations in Nara Prefecture
Buildings and structures in Nara, Nara